Rijksmuseum (Dutch, 'state museum') is the general name for a national museum in the Dutch language.

When only "Rijksmuseum" is used, it usually refers to the Rijksmuseum in Amsterdam.

In the Netherlands these are the following current and former Rijksmusea, sorted by place name:

Amsterdam
Rijksmuseum
Van Gogh Museum
Nederlands Scheepvaartmuseum
Rijksprentenkabinet

Apeldoorn
 Paleis het Loo National Museum

Arnhem
National Heritage Museum

Doorn 
 Huis Doorn

Dordrecht
 Dordrechts Museum

Enkhuizen
Rijksmuseum het Zuiderzeemuseum

Enschede
 Rijksmuseum Twenthe

Leiden

 Rijksmuseum voor Volkenkunde
 Rijksmuseum van Oudheden
 Museum Boerhaave
 Nationaal Natuurhistorisch Museum Naturalis

Muiden
 Rijksmuseum Muiderslot

Otterlo
 Kröller-Müller Museum

Poederoijen
 Slot Loevestein

The Hague
 Koninklijk Kabinet van Schilderijen Mauritshuis
 Museum Meermanno-Westreenianum

Utrecht
  Museum Catharijneconvent

 
Rijksmuseums